Bahman Mehabadi is an Iranian violinist, music teacher, and composer. He is the founder and the director of SOL Music Center and has devoted his life to classical music.

He can be regarded as one of the most versatile violinists of his generation. He has enjoyed great success in SOL Music Ensemble with which he has toured to many of the world's major music centers.

He has performed regularly in Europe, North America, and Asia, both as a recitalist and with SOL Music Ensemble. He also performs regularly with orchestras around the world.

Career 
Bahman Mehabadi was born in Tabriz, Iran, to a family who deeply loved music, art, and literature. After showing passion for music, 8-year-old Bahman was encouraged by his father and started learning music with his mother, an amateur violinist. He began to study violin at Tabriz Music Art School and continued at Conservatory of Azerbaijan with Professor Zavin Yedigharians.

Then he left Iran for higher education in music performance. In a short return to Iran in 1980, he began performing with SOL Quartet which he founded. In another short stay, in 1983, he founded SOL Music Center in Tabriz, which was moved to Tehran after several years of activity. In these times, Mehabadi made his debut in Tehran. At the same time, he was the permanent member of Tehran Symphony Orchestra as a violinist

, as well as the member of Roudaki Chamber Music Orchestra.
Since his debut, Bahman Mehabadi has passionately played throughout all his life and in many countries.

In 2006, Bahman Mehabadi was invited to World Philharmonic Orchestra in Paris, an international orchestra consisting of the top musicians from 82 countries and conducted by Yutaka Sado, to mark the first time of Iran being invited to such event.

He has worked as violinist, violist, and guitarist and also as a professor at SOL Music Educational Institute and other music schools and academies. He has expanded SOL Music Center continuously to the extent that today it is known as one of the best-established music centers in Iran dedicated to classical music. He has always supported young musicians by instructing and introducing them into SOL Music Ensemble and other music centers of the world. Today, many of his students are performing in different music centers of the world. Mehabadi has recorded more than 19 albums

as a soloist and with SOL Music Ensemble. The albums contain pieces from different periods of music. He devotes himself not only to chamber music but with the same success to the solo repertoires. The album named “Mehabadi and J. S.Bach” is the live recording of his performing Bach’s Sonatas and Partitas.

A few years later, it was followed by "Recital", the live recording of violin and piano recital by Bahman Mehabadi and Wolf Iysenger, released by SOL Music in Germany in 2020. During the COVID-19 pandemic limitations Mehabadi returned to his solo repertoire, this time for guitar. He arranged, played and recorded some of the best guitar pieces into his latest album, "My Guitar Favourites", which was released by SOL Music in Germany in 2021.

Discography 
 "Summer" (1997)
 "Fall" (1998)
 "Winter" (1999)
 "Gaiety" (2000)
 "Benedictus" (2003)
 "Creation" (2003)
 "Miniature" (2004)
 "Laudation" (2005)
 "Empyrean" (SOL Ensemble's manifesto in commemoration of Mozart 250th Anniversary, 2007)
 "Song of Peace" (2009)
 "The Beyond" (2010)
 "The Apple" (2011)
 "The Strawberry" (2012)
 "Bloom of Colors" (2013)
 "Mehabadi & Bach" (Sonatas and Partitas, 2014)
 "Aura" (2015)
 "Liebesleid" (2018)
 "Recital" (2020)
 "My Guitar Favourites" (2021)

Books 
Mehabadi has always been concerned about being up-to-date with the latest and the most efficient music teaching methods. He has written three books for violin, viola, and guitar; each serves as a method for beginners, in order to get the students and the music teachers ready for the approach of The Royal Conservatory of Music's Program:

 Violin Series: Beginners (Violin School)
 Viola Series: Beginners (Viola School)
 Guitar Series: Beginners (Guitar School)
For this sake, he also transcribed necessary concertos for viola with his own style of fingerings:
 Viola Series: Viola Concertos (Viola School)
And wrote a Scales Book from Introductory Grade to the 9th (according to the Royal Conservatory of Music's Program), in his own method and fingerings inspired from that of Professor Ivan Galamian and Professor Robert Skelton:
 The Complete Viola Technique Book: Viola Series, technical requirements: Intro - 9 (Viola School)

Articles 
Mehabadi has written more than 100 articles about art and music, most of which are published in different specialized magazines.

From 1990 to 2000, he was the editor of the classical music section of The Art Quarterly magazine (Faslnamye Honar). Many of his articles were published in this magazine; such as:

  (The Latest Edition)
  (The Latest Edition)
 
  (The Latest Edition)
  (The Latest Edition)
  (The Latest Edition)
  (The Latest Edition)
  (The Latest Edition)
  (The Latest Edition)
 
  (The Latest Edition)
 
  (The Latest Edition)
  (The Latest Edition)
  (The Latest Edition)
  (Part 1: The Latest Edition), (Part 2: The Latest Edition), (Part 3: The Latest Edition), (Part 4: The Latest Edition), (Part 5: The Latest Edition)
  (The Latest Edition)
  (The Latest Edition)
  (The Latest Edition)
  (The Latest Edition)
  (The Latest Edition)
  (The Latest Edition
 
  (The Latest Edition)
 

During the lifetime of Ahang Music Quarterly, he was the editor of its classical music section.

Moreover, he has a few articles about music and theater, including the reviews on “Three Sisters” from Anton Chekhov, “An Enemy of the People” from Henrik Ibsen, etc., all published in Theatre (Namayesh) Monthly Review:

Compositions 
Mehabadi has composed many pieces in different forms for ensemble, which are often played in his concerts with SOL Music Ensemble and other music groups; including “Love of Freedom”

, “Sonata in a minor: Nostalgia”

, “Lirico”, “Three Movements for Sorrow”

, “San Fantasy”, “Romance in G”

, “Andre Gide Sonata”, “Letter” for piano and string ensemble, etc. Beside his own compositions, he has also arranged many of classical pieces for his ensemble.

Personal life 
Poetry and painting are Mehabadi's two main leisure activities. Since a teenager, he has been interested in poetry, like his father who was fond of philosophy and literature, and showed a good talent in this field. This was a beginning for him to write his thoughts into poems throughout his life. Now he has several poetry books of his own in which his life philosophy could be perceived.
In 1985 Bahman Mehabadi and Ahad Manteqi collected and published a selection of the poems of their contemporary Iranian poets, in the book "The Voice of the Contemporary Poetry" (Sedaye She're Emrooz):
 
At Tabriz Music Art School, Bahman Mehabadi used to take painting classes of Professor Ibrahim Moqbeli. Since then he still paints in Oil Color and Water Color. Today he has around 50 paintings. It was with such a background that he decided to design the cover of many of the SOL Music albums. SOL Music's logo is one of his graphic designs as well.

References

See More 
 About Bahman Mehabadi, his Albums, and Articles' Full Texts

Living people
20th-century classical violinists
21st-century classical violinists
Male classical violinists
20th-century classical composers
21st-century classical composers
Male composers
Viola pedagogues
Violin pedagogues
20th-century male musicians
21st-century male musicians
Year of birth missing (living people)
People from Tabriz